Torbanite, also known as boghead coal or channel coal, is a variety of fine-grained black oil shale. It usually occurs as lenticular masses, often associated with deposits of Permian coals.  Torbanite is classified as lacustrine type oil shale.

Torbanite is named after Torbane Hill near Bathgate in Scotland, its main location of occurrence. Torbanite found in Bathgate may have formations of bathvillite found within it.

Other major deposits of torbanite are found in Pennsylvania and Illinois, USA, in Mpumalanga Province in South Africa, in the Sydney Basin of New South Wales, Australia, the largest deposit of which is located at Glen Davis, and in Nova Scotia, Canada.

Organic matter (telalginite) in torbanite is derived from lipid-rich microscopic plant remains similar in appearance to the fresh-water colonial green alga Botryococcus braunii.  This evidence and extracellular hydrocarbons produced by the alga have led scientists to examine the alga as a source of Permian torbanites and a possible producer of biofuels.  Torbanite consists of subordinate amounts of vitrinite and inertinite; however, their occurrence varies depending on deposits. 

Torbanite typically comprises 88% carbon and 11% hydrogen.  Paraffin oil can be distilled from some forms of torbanite, a process discovered and patented by James Young in 1851.

See also
Cannel coal
Kukersite
Lamosite
Marinite
Tasmanite
Oil shale geology

References

Coal
Oil shale geology